Gearóid Ó Tuathaigh is Professor Emeritus in History and former Dean of Arts and Vice-President of NUI Galway. He was appointed to the Council of State by the President of Ireland, Michael D. Higgins in 2012.

Ó Tuathaigh graduated with a BA from NUIG followed by an MA. He received a PhD from Peterhouse , Cambridge.

References

External links
Website of the President of Ireland

Year of birth missing (living people)
Living people
Academics of the University of Galway
Presidential appointees to the Council of State (Ireland)
20th-century Irish people
21st-century Irish people
People from County Galway